Robat Karim (also Romanized as Robāţ Karīm is a city in the Central District of Robat Karim County, Tehran province, Iran, and serves as capital of the county. At the 2006 census, its population was 62,937 in 16,675 households. The following census in 2011 counted 78,097 people in 22,742 households. The latest census in 2016 showed a population of 105,393 people in 31,803 households.

References 

Robat Karim County

Cities in Tehran Province

Populated places in Tehran Province

Populated places in Robat Karim County